Anthony Kilhoffer is an American hip hop record producer, songwriter, and engineer, best known for his collaborations with Kanye West, Kid Cudi, Keyshia Cole and John Legend.

Biography
Hailing from Chicago, Illinois, Kilhoffer got his start in the music business as an intern at Trax Records, where he worked with Ministry and other hardcore music acts.  He soon moved to Los Angeles to take a job at Record Plant studios, where he began his professional relationship with Kanye West, first acting as an engineer on a series of Floetry recordings, produced by West. 

This commenced a working relationship with West that extended more than a decade, serving as engineer and/or producer on West's albums The College Dropout, Late Registration, Graduation, 808s and Heartbreak, My Beautiful Dark Twisted Fantasy, Watch The Throne (with Jay-Z), Cruel Summer, Yeezus, and The Life of Pablo.

Kilhoffer eventually expanded his musical collaborations to include Iggy Azalea (with whom he shared a 2015 Grammy Award nomination for Record of the Year), John Legend, Kid Cudi, Rick Ross, Keisha Cole, Common, The Pussycat Dolls, Rihanna, and Travis Scott, whom Kilhoffer discovered and initially managed upon Scott's 2012 debut. 

Kilhoffer's musical output has resulted in four Grammy Award wins and five additional nominations.

Select discography

Albums

2020s
 Free The Beast (album) - B-Free

2010s
 Passion, Pain & Demon Slayin' - Kid Cudi
 The Life of Pablo - Kanye West
 Status - Marracash
 Yeezus - Kanye West
 Watch the Throne - Jay-Z & Kanye West
 My Beautiful Dark Twisted Fantasy - Kanye West 
 Man on the Moon II - Kid Cudi	
 No Mercy - T.I.
 Teflon Don (album) - Rick Ross

2000s
 Straight No Chaser - Mr. Hudson
 For Your Entertainment - Adam Lambert
 Man on the Moon - Kid Cudi
 808s & Heartbreak - Kanye West
 Just Like You - Keyshia Cole
 Evolver - John Legend
 Thriller (25th Anniversary) - Michael Jackson
 Rising Down - The Roots
 Good Girl Gone Bad - Rihanna
 Graduation - Kanye West
 Como Ama una Mujer - Jennifer Lopez
 Finding Forever - Common
 Once Again - John Legend
 Late Registration - Kanye West
 Get Lifted - John Legend
 PCD - The Pussycat Dolls
 Be - Common
 The College Dropout - Kanye West
 I Changed My Mind - Keyshia Cole
 Elephunk - The Black Eyed Peas

1990s
 It's Real - K-Ci & JoJo

Awards
Grammy Award for Best Rap Album
 2011 - My Beautiful Dark Twisted Fantasy - Kanye West
 2007 - Graduation - Kanye West
 2005 - Late Registration - Kanye West

Grammy Award for Best R&B Album
 2005 - Get Lifted - John Legend

References

External links
Official website
Anthony Kilhoffer discography at AllMusic

Year of birth missing (living people)
Living people
Musicians from Illinois
American hip hop record producers
American audio engineers
Midwest hip hop musicians